Catops basilaris is a species of small carrion beetle in the family Leiodidae. It is found in North America.

References

 Majka C, Langor D (2008). "The Leiodidae (Coleoptera) of Atlantic Canada: new records, faunal composition, and zoogeography". ZooKeys 2: 357–402.
 Peck, Stewart B., and Joyce Cook (2002). "Systematics, distributions, and bionomics of the small carrion beetles (Coleoptera: Leiodidae: Cholevinae: Cholevini) of North America". The Canadian Entomologist, vol. 134, no. 6, 723–787.
 Salgado, J. M. (1999). "The Leiodidae (Coleoptera) of the Carnegie Museum of Natural History. New data and description of two new species". The Pan-Pacific Entomologist, vol. 75, no. 1, 35–47.

Further reading

 Arnett, R.H. Jr., M. C. Thomas, P. E. Skelley and J. H. Frank. (eds.). (2002). American Beetles, Volume II: Polyphaga: Scarabaeoidea through Curculionoidea. CRC Press LLC, Boca Raton, FL.
 Arnett, Ross H. (2000). American Insects: A Handbook of the Insects of America North of Mexico. CRC Press.
 Richard E. White. (1983). Peterson Field Guides: Beetles. Houghton Mifflin Company.

Leiodidae
Beetles described in 1823